Per Rune Wølner (14 June 1949 – 15 October 2016) was a Norwegian footballer who played as a right-back for Strømsgodset in his hometown Drammen. Wølner spent his entire 13-year career at Strømsgodset, making his first-team debut in 1968. He was a member of the Strømsgodset sides that won the Norwegian Premier League in 1970, and the Norwegian Cup in 1969, 1970 and 1973. He played a total of 234 league and cup matches for the club, scoring three goals.

Wølner died on 15 October 2016, after a lengthy battle against cancer.

References

1949 births
2016 deaths
Norwegian footballers
Strømsgodset Toppfotball players
Association football defenders
Sportspeople from Drammen
Deaths from cancer in Norway